Nguyen Dinh Ngoc (13 August 1932 – 2 May 2006) was a Vietnamese Army intelligence officer, later a general, and a mathematician.

Biography
Nguyễn Đình Ngọc was born in Phượng Dực commune, Phú Xuyên District, Hanoi, Vietnam. In 1953, he joined the Intelligence Service and served in the Vietminh Army in the field of public security. He was then assigned to Saigon to work as a spy for North Vietnam (officially known as the Democratic Republic of Vietnam). In 1955, he moved to France to complete his studies after being awarded a scholarship. He attended the University of Paris, from which he graduated with three engineering degrees: Hydrology and Meteorology, Shipbuilding and Telecommunications. Additionally, he earned a Ph.D. in Geography and in Mathematics, under the supervision of Charles Ehresmann, with a thesis entitled "Sur les espaces fibres et les prolongements" (On fiber bundles and prolongations) at the Paris-Sorbonne University in 1963.

Activity

In 1966, Ngoc returned to Vietnam where he was assigned the task of managing and developing the public telecommunications in the field of information security and technology for South Vietnam (officially known as Republic of Vietnam), while teaching mathematics at the Saigon University of Science and at various colleges in South Vietnam, as told by himself in an autobiographical article. At the same time he was a communist spy who sent important information to the North. After the Fall of Saigon and reunification of Vietnam on 30 April 1975, he helped developing the computer and telecommunication for the Socialist Republic of Vietnam's government. He also studied and accessed the computers provided by Soviet Union and other communist countries.

In 1989 Ngoc joined a newly established Thang Long University - a private university in Hanoi. He is a founder of the Radio and Electronics Association of Vietnam and the Informatics Association of Vietnam. In 1994 he was promoted to Major general of Vietnam People's Public Security (police and security forces).

Death 
He died of cancer on May 2, 2006 at the hospital 198 (Ministry of Public Security).

Works

References

External links

1932 births
2006 deaths
Differential geometers
20th-century Vietnamese mathematicians
University of Paris alumni
Deaths from cancer in Vietnam
21st-century Vietnamese mathematicians
Vietnamese generals